The Glory of Clementina is a 1922 American silent drama film directed by Emile Chautard and starring Pauline Frederick, Edward Martindel and George Cowl. It is based on the 1911 novel The Glory of Clementina Wing by British author William John Locke. It is now considered a lost film. It had previously been adapted into a 1915 short film of the same title.

Plot

Cast
 Pauline Frederick as Clementina Wing
 Edward Martindel as 	Quixtus
 George Cowl as 	Huckaby
 Lincoln Plumer as 	Billiter
 Edward Hearn as Tommy Burgrave
 Jean Calhoun as 	Etta Concannon
 Clarence Wilson as 	Vandemeer 
 Louise Dresser as 	Lena Fontaine
 Helen Stone as 	Little Sheila
 Lydia Yeamans Titus as 	Shiela's Maid
 Truly Shattuck as 	Lady Louise Malling

References

Bibliography
 Munden, Kenneth White. The American Film Institute Catalog of Motion Pictures Produced in the United States, Part 1. University of California Press, 1997.

External links
 

1922 films
1922 drama films
American black-and-white films
American silent feature films
Films directed by Emile Chautard
Film Booking Offices of America films
1920s English-language films
Films based on British novels
1920s American films
Silent American drama films
Films with screenplays by Richard Schayer